Wenxiang (born October 16, 1818, in Liaoyang, died May 26, 1876) was an ethnic Manchu statesman of the Qing dynasty of China. Wenxiang hailed from the Gūwalgiya clan and belonged to the Plain Red Banner in the Eight Banners in Mukden. In 1845, he obtained the highest degree (jinshi) in the imperial examination and four years later he was appointed to the Board of Works. He advanced through the ranks and in 1858, he was appointed vice president to the Board of Rites and also became a member of the Grand Council, the highest policy-making organ in the Empire. He subsequently held a number of prominent posts in the central government and became a key player in court politics.

As foreign troops invaded Beijing during the Second Opium War and the Xianfeng Emperor fled to Chengde, Wenxiang remained in the capital and took part in negotiating with the British and French. Following the peace settlement, he became one of the founders of the new Qing foreign office, the Zongli Yamen. He was one of the architects behind the Self-strengthening movement and was instrumental in devising the Qing government's cooperative policy towards the Western powers in the period between 1861 and 1876.

References

 Crossley, Pamela Kyle, ''Orphan Warriors' (1990), 141–146..

1818 births
1876 deaths
Manchu Plain Red Bannermen
Manchu politicians
Grand Councillors of the Qing dynasty
Politicians from Liaoyang
Qing dynasty politicians from Liaoning
Grand Secretaries of the Qing dynasty
Assistant Grand Secretaries
Ministers of Zongli Yamen